The 1976 CFL Draft composed of 10 rounds where 106 Canadian football players were chosen from eligible Canadian universities and Canadian players playing in the NCAA. A total of 18 players were selected as territorial exemptions, with the Calgary Stampeders being the only team to make no picks during this stage of the draft. Through a trade with the Toronto Argonauts, the Edmonton Eskimos selected first overall in the draft. The Eskimos had four total picks in the first round of the draft alone.

Territorial exemptions
Toronto Argonauts                             Neil Lumsden  TB  Ottawa

Toronto Argonauts                                 Steve Telfer  TE  Saint Mary's

Toronto Argonauts                                 Vic Wasilenko  DB  British Columbia

British Columbia Lions                        Bill Norton  DT  Weber State

British Columbia Lions  Glen Jackson  LB  Simon Fraser

British Columbia Lions                            Mitch Davies  E  Calgary

Hamilton Tiger-Cats  Bill Harrison          TB               Ottawa

Hamilton Tiger-Cats  John Kelley  DB  Guelph

Winnipeg Blue Bombers                         Ted Milian  G  Manitoba

Winnipeg Blue Bombers                             Rick Koswin            WR               Manitoba

Ottawa Rough Riders                            Jeff Avery             WR               Ottawa

Ottawa Rough Riders                                John Palazeti  TB  Richmond

Saskatchewan Roughriders                      Ron Cherkas  DT  University of Utah

Saskatchewan Roughriders                          Brian O'Hara  TB  Whitworth

Montreal Alouettes                            Yvon Thibeault  T  McGill

Montreal Alouettes  Rodney Ward  LB  Bishop's

Edmonton Eskimos                                  Brian Fryer  WR  Alberta

Edmonton Eskimos  Walter Bauer  TE Drake

1st round

2nd round
10. British Columbia Lions                        Len Platt  WR Tulsa

11. British Columbia Lions                        John Turecki           DE                 British Columbia

12. Calgary Stampeders                        Jay Parry  WR  Western Ontario

13. Hamilton Tiger-Cats                           Barry Cozack  TB  Mount Allison

14. Winnipeg Blue Bombers  Gordon Taylor  QB  Wilfrid Laurier

15. Edmonton Eskimos                              Steve Andryjowicz  TB  Toronto

16. Saskatchewan Roughriders                      Bog Gibbons  DT  Saskatchewan

17. Winnipeg Blue Bombers                         Ron Mironuck           LB                 Whitworth

18. Edmonton Eskimos                              Eric Upton             G                  Ottawa

3rd round
19. Toronto Argonauts  Rodney Allison         LB                 Saint Mary's

20. British Columbia Lions                        Dale Parkhouse         TE                 Western Ontario

21. Calgary Stampeders  Dave McMillan  WR  Concordia

22. Hamilton Tiger-Cats  Paul Whaley             DB                 Guelph

23. Winnipeg Blue Bombers                         Tim Maltre  WR  Memphis State

24. Montreal Alouettes                            Charles McMann         TB                 Wilfrid Laurier

25. Saskatchewan Roughriders  John Glassford         LB                 Wilfrid Laurier

26. Montreal Alouettes                            Errol Moen             DT                 Alberta

27. Edmonton Eskimos                              Darrell Penner  DB  Queen's

4th round
28. Toronto Argonauts                             Brian Utley            TE                 Saskatchewan

29. British Columbia Lions                        Gerald Inglis          LB                 Alberta

30. Calgaray Stampeders                           Richard Haswell        FB                 Wilfrid Laurier

31. Hamilton Tiger-Cats                           Paul Genovese  G  McMaster

32. Winnipeg Blue Bombers                         Henry Booy             E                  British Columbia

33. Ottawa Rough Riders                           Drew Allan  G  Carleton

34. Saskatchewan Roughriders                      Terry West             DB                 Ottawa

35. Montreal Alouettes                            Glen Leach             DB                 Wilfrid Laurier

36. Edmonton Eskimos  Rick Scarborough       TB                 Western Ontario

5th round
37. Toronto Argonauts  Bob Palmer             TB                 York

38. British Columbia Lions                        Jim Cimba              DB                 Western Ontario

39. Calgary Stampeders                            Larry Titley           LB                 Concordia

40. Hamilton Tiger-Cats                           Rick Slipetz           LB                 York

41. Winnipeg Blue Bombers                         Wayne Churchill  DE  Windsor

42. Ottawa Rough Riders                           Doug Kitts            QB                   York

43. Saskatchewan Roughriders  Greg Wood             DB                  Windsor

44. Montreal Alouettes                            Bill McIver           DB                  Queen's

45. Edmonton Eskimos                              Mark Ackley           WR                  Toronto

6th round
46. Toronto Argonauts  Doug Falconer         DB                  Ottawa

47. British Columbia Lions                        Greg Gardner          QB                  British Columbia

48. Calgary Stampeders                            Nick Grittani         DT                  Toronto

49. Hamilton Tiger-Cats                           Mike Sokonvin         DT                  Toronto

50. Winnipeg Blue Bombers  Gary Anderson         DE                  Concordia

51. Ottawa Rough Riders  Jim Anderson          T                   Alberta

52. Saskatchewan Roughriders  Hugh Gallagher        DE                  Carleton

53. Montreal Alouettes                            Paul Szlichta  QB  Purdue

54. Edmonton Eskimos  Jim Kemp              T                   Saskatchewan

7th round
55. Toronto Argonauts                             John Montelpare      LB                  Concordia

56. Toronto Argonauts  Peter Sorenson        DT                  Bishop's

57. Calgary Stampeders                            Mike Walukavich       DT                  Concordia

58. Hamilton Tiger-Cats                           Rick Jeysman          DT                  Toronto

59. Winnipeg Blue Bombers                         Claude Riopelle       DE                  Western Ontario

60. Ottawa Rough Riders  Fred Brown            LB                  Wilfrid Laurier

61. Saskatchewan Roughriders                      Dalton Smarsh         TB                  Alberta

62. Montreal Alouettes                            Rod Millard           DB                  McMaster

63. Edmonton Eskimos                              Rob Nelms             DT                  Carleton

8th round
64. Toronto Argonauts                             Jim Trimm             TE                  Toronto

65. British Columbia Lions  Glen Wallace          TB                  Simon Fraser

66. Calgary Stampeders                            Bill Lockhart         C                   Guelph

67. Hamilton Tiger-Cats                           Frank Mckay           DB                  Western Ontario

68. Winnipeg Blue Bombers  Bruce Young           TB                  Manitoba

69. Ottawa Rough Riders                           Paul Lojewski         G                   Windsor

70. Saskatchewan Roughriders                      Ken Platz             TB                  Saskatchewan

71. Montreal Alouettes                            Larry Baines          TB                  McMaster

72. Calgary Stampeders                            Norm Hagarty          WR                  Wilfrid Laurier

9th round
73. Toronto Argonauts                             Gary McCann           TB                  Windsor

74. British Columbia Lions                        Peter Coll  DB  Dalhousie

75. Calgary Stampeders  Mike Weller           WR                  Wilfrid Laurier

76. Hamilton Tiger-Cats                           Marty Dixon           E                   Western Ontario

77. Winnipeg Blue Bombers                         Brian Wagner         DE                   Manitoba

78. Ottawa Rough Riders  Robert Forbes  WR  New Brunswick

79. Toronto Argonauts  George Beattie  DB  Acadia

80. Calgary Stampeders                            Gordon Penn          TB                   British Columbia

10th round
81. Toronto Argonauts                             Maurice St. Martin   T                    Queen's

82. British Columbia Lions                        Tony Ricci           G                    British Columbia

83. Calgary Stampeders                            Doug Ransome         WR                   Dalhousie

84. Hamilton Tiger-Cats                           Jon Jewell           LB                   Western Ontario

85. Winnipeg Blue Bombers                         Mike Kashty          TE                   Manitoba

86. Ottawa Rough Riders                           Chris Kziezopoloski  WR                   Waterloo

87. Toronto Argonauts                             Bernie Muldoon       TB                   Windsor

88. British Columbia Lions                        Bob Janzen           TB                   British Columbia

References
Canadian Draft

Cfl Draft, 1976
Canadian College Draft